The 1972 Chatham Cup was the 45th annual nationwide knockout football competition in New Zealand.

Early stages of the competition were run on a regional basis, with the National League teams receiving a bye until the later stages of the competition. In all, 99 teams took part in the competition. Different sources give different numberings for the rounds of the competition: some start round one with the beginning of the regional qualifications; others start numbering from the first national knock-out stage. The former numbering scheme is used in this article. 

The final saw the end of a Chatham Cup era, being the last final to be held at the Basin Reserve until 1980. The Basin Reserve had been the host of every final since 1928.

The 1972 final
The 1972 final was a marathon effort, unprecedented and unequalled in Chatham Cup history. In the days before penalty shoot-outs replays were played if scores were level after extra time. The 1972 final required not one, but two replays, with the first of these being held in Christchurch (the first time that city had been host to a final match). The total aggregate of 13 goals across the three matches was a record for a final - indeed the eight goals in the first match equalled the previous record. In the first match, Christchurch United's Graham Dacombe became the first player to score four goals in one final since John Donovan in 1958. All three matches were refereed by R.W. Harries.

The first match was played in typical windy conditions at Wellington. United played with the wind in the first spell and should have had the lead early on when Mount keeper Kevin Curtin appeared to step back across his goal-line when holding onto a Vic Pollard cross. The referee turned down their appeal and the goal was not given. United were soon to gain the lead, however, with the first of Dacombe's four strikes. Two goals from penalties for the Mount, both taken by Ron Armstrong, followed before Dacombe restored the balance. In the second half Brian Turner put Mount Wellington into the lead for a second time, only for Dacombe to again level before the final whistle.  In extra time it was United who took the lead for a second occasion, and it required a late Earle Thomas equaliser to send the tie to a second game.

The second match was played on Christchurch United's territory at English Park, the first time a final had ever been played outsider the North Island. Compared with the first match it was a dour game, with only one goal a piece and nowhere near the first tie's excitement. Dennis Tindall opened the scoring for Mount Wellington, and the only other goal of the game was the equaliser from Ian Park.

The third bout took place at Mount Wellington's Newmarket Park ground, and finally it produced a result. Alan Park opened the scoring for United before the interval, followed in the second spell by Alan Marley. Armstrong pulled one back — again from the penalty spot — but that was the last of the scoring. There were vociferous protest from the Mount when substitute Dave Taylor had a late effort disallowed, but in the minds of many this was poetic justice for Pollard's denied effort in the first match.

Results

Third Round

* Won on penalties by Queens Park (4-3) and Rangers (6-5)

Fourth Round

Fifth Round

Quarter-finals

Semi-finals

Final

Replays

References

Rec.Sport.Soccer Statistics Foundation New Zealand 1972 page
UltimateNZSoccer website 1972 Chatham Cup page

Chatham Cup
Chatham Cup
Chatham Cup
September 1972 sports events in New Zealand